The Carroll County School District is a public school district in Carroll County, Georgia, United States, based in Carrollton. It serves the communities of Bowdon, two thirds of unincorporated Bremen, Mount Zion, Roopville, Temple, Villa Rica, and Whitesburg.

History

Drug testing
In 2015 the district announced that it will begin randomly drug test students at its high schools; students may be drug tested if they participate in extracurricular programs, including athletic and non-athletic ones, and persons who drive automobiles to school.

Controversies

Superintendent hiring practices controversy
In 2022, the school board voted to renew the contract of superintendent Scott Cowart, however, this vote was divided with three of the seven board members voting against, citing a lack of diversity and equity in hiring practices by Cowart and his failure to give due notice to the board of his intention to renew his contract. Cowart has served as superintendent since 2010.

Unreserved fund balance
A candidate for the school board accused the district of maintaining an unreserved fund balance in excess beyond standards set by state law. Candidate Bill Kecskes claimed from personal research that the board maintained a $46,107,371 UFB: 31.28% of the 2022 fiscal year operating budget of $147,405,087. Kecskes also referred to OCGA 20-2-167(a)5 which sets target unreserved fund balances for school boards at "not less than 12-14% of annual operating expenditures for the subsequent fiscal year budget, not to exceed 15% of the total budget of the subsequent school year". The superintendent denied the claims made by Kecskes and stated the numbers were only targets as opposed to legal mandates.

Schools
The Carroll County School District has twelve elementary schools, six middle schools, and five high schools.

Elementary schools
Bowdon Elementary School
Central Elementary School
Glanton-Hindsman Elementary School
Ithica Elementary School
Mount Zion Elementary School
Providence Elementary School
Roopville Elementary School
Sand Hill Elementary School
Sharp Creek Elementary School
Temple Elementary School
Villa Rica Elementary School
Whitesburg Elementary School

Middle schools
Bay Springs Middle School
Bowdon Middle School
Central Middle School
Mount Zion Middle School
Temple Middle School
Villa Rica Middle School

High schools
Bowdon High School
Central High School
Mount Zion High School
Temple High School
Villa Rica High School

Performing Arts Center 
The Carroll County Schools Performing Arts Center was opened in 2017 to accommodate various needs of the school district. Designed as a music hall, the school system claims the venue as "the most acoustically calibrated facility in the western portion of Georgia". The auditorium can seat up to 1,100 people and hosts multiple side rooms for district staff meetings and exhibitions.

See also
Carrollton City School District

References

External links
Carroll County School District

School districts in Georgia (U.S. state)
Education in Carroll County, Georgia